Rubinomics, a portmanteau of Rubin and economics, was originally used to collectively describe the economic policies of President of the United States Bill Clinton. It is named after Robert E. Rubin, former United States Secretary of the Treasury.

Rubinomics emphasizes the effect that balancing the government budget has on long-term interest rates.  Taxes should match government spending in the long run, and deficit-financed tax cuts are a counter-productive way to increase growth. This can be seen as a form of the fiscal theory of the price level – fiscal policy affecting long term inflation (as expressed by long-term interest rates).

Rubinomics has never rejected Keynesian approaches to economics, which call for the government to run a deficit in times of recession. But it worries about the long-term effect that deficits, especially structural deficits, have on inflation. 

During the early 1990s, long-term interest rates remained stubbornly high even as the Federal Reserve cut the Federal Funds rate. Rubin and most other economists (including Alan Greenspan) attributed this high yield curve to an "inflation premium" that bond-traders were demanding. Reducing interest rates, Rubin argued, would lead to increased private sector investment and consumption and, therefore, stronger growth. Clinton, who had campaigned on the promise to put people first and invest in human capital, accepted Rubin's reasoning and put deficit reduction at the forefront of his economic plan, to the chagrin of more left-wing advisers such as Robert Reich and Joseph Stiglitz.  In particular, Stiglitz was not opposed to Clinton's plan to reduce the deficit, but suggested that Clinton put more money into research and development, technology, infrastructure, and education, quoting "given the high returns for these investments, GDP in 2000 would have been even higher, and the economy's growth potential would have been stronger."

See also 
 Clintonomics
 Democratic Party (United States)
 Fiscal theory of the price level
 Freakonomics
 Reaganomics

References
 
 

Economic history of the United States